The House at 97 Adriatic Avenue is a historic home in the Davis Islands neighborhood of Tampa, Florida, United States. It is located at 97 Adriatic Avenue.

On August 3, 1989, it was added to the U.S. National Register of Historic Places.

References and external links

 Hillsborough County listings at National Register of Historic Places

Houses in Tampa, Florida
History of Tampa, Florida
Houses on the National Register of Historic Places in Hillsborough County, Florida
Mediterranean Revival architecture of Davis Islands, Tampa, Florida
1927 establishments in Florida
Houses completed in 1927